Gagrellissa jacobsoni is a species of harvestmen in a monotypic genus in the family Sclerosomatidae from the Sunda Islands.

References

Harvestmen
Monotypic arachnid genera